Shinde ministry may refer to:

* Sushilkumar Shinde ministry, the Maharashtra government led by Sushilkumar Shinde from January 2003 to November 2004
 Eknath Shinde ministry, the Maharashtra government led by Eknath Shinde since June 2022

See also
 Chief Minister of Maharashtra